Bovine alphaherpesvirus 5 (BoHV-5) is a virus species of the genus Varicellovirus and subfamily Alphaherpesvirinae. It causes meningoencephalitis and respiratory disease in cattle and sheep. As with all herpes viruses latent infection can occur, with recrudescence at times of stressed and/or immunosuppression. Sites of latency include the CNS and mucosae of the nose and trachea. The disease has been documented in South America, the United States, Australia, Germany and Hungary. Caused by: BHV-5 – Bovine Encephalitis Virus – Bovine Encephalitis Herpesvirus

Disease is most common in calves up to ten months of age.

Clinical signs and diagnosis 
Signs of respiratory disease include tachycardia and tachypnea with pyrexia, dyspnea, mucoid nasal discharge, hypersalivation and abnormal lung sounds. Systemic signs such as lethargy and anorexia are seen.

Neurological signs are normally acute. These signs include opisthotonus, hyperaesthesia, abnormal behaviour, ataxia, head pressing, blindness, proprioceptive deficits, coma and seizures. Sudden death occurs in neonates. Subacute disease almost always fatal, causing depression, anorexia, ataxia and a pronounced dyspnea.

Animals that recover from the infection or become infected following Bovine alphaherpesvirus 1 infection become latent carriers.

To diagnose infection, the virus is identified using specific monoclonal antibodies, PCR or ELISA. Neurological lesions should be identifiable on postmortem examination.

Treatment and control 
There is currently no treatment or specific vaccine for Bovine alphaherpesvirus 5, but Bovine alphaherpesvirus 1 vaccines seem to provide some cross-protection.

See also 
 Bovine herpesvirus (disambiguation)

References 
 Bovine Herpesvirus 5, reviewed and published by WikiVet at Bovine Herpesvirus 5 - WikiVet English, accessed 23 August 2011.

External links 

 
 

Varicelloviruses
Bovine diseases
Animal viral diseases